Stanley Woodley Betts CBE (23 March 1912 – 7 June 2003) was an Anglican bishop in the 20th century.

Life
Betts was educated at Perse School and Jesus College, Cambridge. He was ordained in 1936 and was successively a wartime chaplain with the RAF, a chaplain at Clare College, Cambridge, the Vicar of Holy Trinity, Cambridge and then, in 1956, the Bishop of Maidstone with the additional title of Archbishop of Canterbury's Episcopal Representative with the three Armed Forces. (Before his appointment, the last Bishop of Maidstone had been Leslie Owen, who was translated to Lincoln in 1946.) From 1966 he was Dean of Rochester, a post he held for 11 years.

References

1912 births
People educated at The Perse School
Alumni of Jesus College, Cambridge
Royal Air Force Volunteer Reserve personnel of World War II
World War II chaplains
Bishops of Maidstone
Bishops to the Forces
20th-century Church of England bishops
Deans of Rochester
Commanders of the Order of the British Empire
2003 deaths
Royal Air Force chaplains